Ben Loring (born February 23, 1953) is an American attorney and politician who served as a member of the Oklahoma House of Representatives for the 7th District from 2015 to 2021. His district includes Delaware and Ottawa counties in the northeastern portion of the state.

Early life and education
Born in Lake Charles, Louisiana, Loring grew up in Bartlesville, Oklahoma. He received a Bachelor of Arts degree in political science from the University of Oklahoma at Norman and a Juris Doctor from the University of Oklahoma College of Law.

Career 
He practiced law in Miami, Oklahoma and served as district attorney there from 1991 through 1999. He then entered private practice. From 2004 until his election to the House, Loring served as first assistant district attorney. He served fifteen years on the Oklahoma Commission on Children and Youth, including three terms as chairman. In November 2014 Loring was elected to the Oklahoma House of Representatives.

Loring was unopposed in the general election held on November 4, 2014.

Loring has served as a long affiliation with the Boy Scouts of America, having been a Cub scoutmaster, Boy scoutmaster and a Scout troop committee chairman.

Committee assignments 
Loring served on these legislative committees:
 A&B Judiciary
 A&B Public Safety
 Public Safety
 Tourism and International Relations

Personal life 
He lives in Miami with his wife, Barbara, a special-education teacher. Although the Lorings are not Native Americans, they adopted their two sons, who are members of the Seneca-Cayuga Nation, with the help of the tribe.

References

External links
Oklahoma House of Representatives homepage
Oklahoma House of Representatives profile
Project Vote Smart profile
Ben Loring website

1953 births
Living people
Democratic Party members of the Oklahoma House of Representatives
District attorneys in Oklahoma
People from Miami, Oklahoma
Politicians from Lake Charles, Louisiana
University of Oklahoma alumni
University of Oklahoma College of Law alumni
21st-century American politicians